Lea is a surname. Notable people with the surname include:

People

In music
 Brandin Lea, the lead singer of Texas-based band Flickerstick and side project The February Chorus
 Jim Lea (musician) (born 1949), English bass guitarist (Slade)

In military
 Edward Lea, officer in the United States Navy during the American Civil War
 Homer Lea, general in the army of Sun Yat-sen and a writer of several books of geopolitics; cousin to Thomas C. Lea
 Thomas Calloway Lea, Jr., was a prominent American attorney from El Paso, Texas, and mayor of that city from 1915 to 1917; cousin to Homer Lea

In politics
 Alfred R. Lea (1853–1931), American politician
 Chris Lea, the first openly gay political party leader in Canadian history
 Luke Lea (1783–1851), two-term United States Representative from Tennessee
 Luke Lea (1879–1945), Democratic United States Senator from Tennessee (1911–1917)
 Pryor Lea, two-term U.S. Representative from Tennessee
 Preston Lea (1841–1916), American businessman and politician, Governor of Delaware
 Sir Thomas Lea Liberal MP for Kidderminster (1868–1874)
 Walter Maxfield Lea, Prince Edward Island politician

In sports
 Arthur Lea (1866–1945), Welsh international footballer
 Charlie Lea, former starting pitcher in Major League Baseball
 Cyril Lea, Welsh footballer
 Isaac Lea (footballer) (1911-1972), English professional footballer
 Jim Lea (athlete) (1932–2010), American sprinter
 Leslie Lea, English footballer

In other fields
 Arthur Mills Lea, Australian entomologist
 Doug Lea, professor of Computer Science at State University of New York at Oswego where he specializes in concurrent programming
 Henry Charles Lea, American publisher, civic activist, philanthropist and historian
 Isaac Lea, American publisher, conchologist and geologist
 Larry Lea, American televangelist
 Margaret Lea Houston, former First Lady of the Republic of Texas
 Matthew Carey Lea (1823-1897), American chemist
 Nancy Moffette Lea (1780–1864) was the mother of Margaret Lea Houston and mother-in-law of Sam Houston.
 Nicholas Lea, actor
 Ron Lea, Canadian actor
 Sheila Lea, British artist
 Thomas C. Lea, III (Tom Lea), American muralist, illustrator, artist, war correspondent, novelist, and historian

See also
 Justice Lea (disambiguation)
 Lea (disambiguation)
 Leah
 Lee (disambiguation)
 Leigh (disambiguation)

English-language surnames